James "Jamey" Driscoll (born November 11, 1986, in Jericho, Vermont) is professional American Cyclocross and road racing cyclist. Driscoll's career was thrust into prominence following an eye-opening performance at the 2008 US Cyclocross National Championships in Kansas City, Missouri, where Driscoll bested many of the pre-race favorites en route to a second-place finish – his first career Elite Cyclocross medal. Driscoll made a name for himself riding for the New England-based Fiordifruita team, before signing with the Cannondale/Cyclocrossworld.com professional cyclocross team before the 2008 season. On the road, Driscoll's exploits with Fiordifruita garnered him a spot on the controversial  squad at the beginning of the 2009 season. After a tumultuous road season, Driscoll signed with the  squad for 2010.

Major Accomplishments 

In his second full season with the Cannondale/Cyclocrossworld.com team, Driscoll won arguably the biggest race of his career, beating an all-star field at the 2009 edition of Cross Vegas, in Las Vegas, Nevada. Driscoll's only other win of the year came at the second day of the Cycle-Smart International in Northampton, Massachusetts. Despite only two victories on the season, Driscoll wore the leaders jersey for the U.S. Gran Prix of cyclocross following the series' fifth stop, the Mercer Cup, and finished up the series in third place overall. Driscoll consistently performed well in the North American Cyclocross Trophy as well, finishing up third overall in the series standings.

Driscoll's first year with Cannondale/Cyclocrossworld.com brought a wealth of good results, including the overall victory in the Verge New England Cyclocross Championship Series, winning seven of the series' nine races. On the road, Driscoll also won the third stage of the American Eagle Tour of Pennsylvania.

Championships

Driscoll won his first US Cyclocross National Championship as a junior in 2003, in Portland Oregon, one year after finishing in second place. In 2006, Driscoll grabbed his second National Championships, this time in the Collegiate Men's category, while riding for the University of Vermont, a feat which he repeated in 2007. Also in 2007, Driscoll was narrowly bested by Bjørn Selander in a two-up sprint for the Espoirs title.

Palmares 

2002 – Green Mountain Bicycle Club
 2nd (Junior)  Cyclocross National Championships – Portland, OR
2003 – Green Mountain Bicycle Club
 1st (Junior)  Cyclocross National Championships – Portland, OR
2006 – Fiordifruita
 1st (Collegiate)  Cyclo-cross National Championships- Providence, Rhode Island
 4th (U23)  Cyclo-cross National Championships – Providence, Rhode Island
2007 – Fiordifruita
 1st (Collegiate)  Cyclo-cross National Championships- Kansas City, Kansas
 2nd (U23)  Cyclo-cross National Championships – Kansas City, Kansas
2008 – Cannondale/Cyclocrossworld.com
 2nd  Cyclo-cross National Championships – Kansas City, Missouri
 Crank Brothers US Gran Prix of Cyclocross
 4th USGP #4 – Mercer Cup #2 West Windsor, New Jersey
 North American Cyclocross Trophy
 2nd NACT #8 – Whitmore's Supercross Cup #2 Southampton, New York
 1st Overall, New England Cyclocross Championship Series (NECCS)
 1st NECCS #9 – NBX Gran Prix #2 Warwick, Rhode Island
 1st NECCS #8 – NBX Gran Prix #1 Warwick, Rhode Island
 1st NECCS #7 – Bay State Cyclocross Sterling, Massachusetts
 1st NECCS #6 – Cycle-Smart International #2 Northampton, Vermont
 1st NECCS #5 – Cycle-Smart International #1 Northampton, Vermont
 1st NECCS #2 – Green Mountain Cyclocross #2 Williston, Vermont
 1st NECCS #1 – Green Mountain Cyclocross #1 Williston, Vermont
 3rd NECCS #4 – Gran Prix of Gloucester #2 Gloucester, Massachusetts
 4th NECCS #3 – Gran Prix of Gloucester #1 Gloucester, Massachusetts
 1st Nittany Lion Cross Fogelsville, Pennsylvania
2008 – Fiordifruita
 1st Stage 3 – American Eagle Tour of Pennsylvania
2009 – University of Vermont
1st (Collegiate)  Road Race Championships – Fort Collins, Colorado
2009 – Cannondale/Cyclocrossworld.com
 3rd Overall, US Gran Prix of Cyclocross
 2nd USGP #4 – Derby City Cup #2 Louisville, Kentucky
 2nd USGP #3 – Derby City Cup #1 Louisville, Kentucky
 3rd USGP #5 – Mercer Cup #1 West Windsor, New Jersey
 5th USGP #7 – Portland Cup #1 Portland, OR
 5th USGP #6 – Mercer Cup #2 West Windsor, New Jersey
 3rd Overall, North American Cyclocross Trophy
 2nd NACT #5 – Toronto International Cyclocross #1 Toronto, ON
 2nd NACT #3 – Gran Prix of Gloucester #1 Gloucester, Massachusetts
 3rd NACT #10 – Whitmore's Supercross Cup #2 Southampton, New York
 3rd NACT #9 – Witmore's Supercross Cup #1 Southampton, New York
 3rd NACT #8 – Boulder Cup Boulder, Colorado
 3rd NACT #7 – Blue Sky Velo Cup Longmont, Colorado
 3rd NACT #6 – Toronto International Cyclocross #2 Toronto, ON
 3rd NACT #2 – Rad Racing Gran Prix Lakewood, WA
 4th NACT #4 – Gran Prix of Gloucester #2 Gloucester, Massachusetts
 Verge New England Cyclocross Championship Series
 1st NECCS #10 – Cycle-Smart International #2 Northampton, Massachusetts
 2nd NECCS #9 – Cycle-Smart International #1 Northampton, Massachusetts
 2nd NECCS #6 – Providence Cyclocross #2 Providence, Rhode Island
 2nd NECCS #5 – Providence Cyclocross #1 Providence, Rhode Island

References 

Living people
1986 births
American male cyclists
Cyclo-cross cyclists
Cyclists from Vermont
People from Jericho, Vermont